Zhang Yuning may refer to:
Zhang Yuning (footballer, born 1977), Chinese retired footballer, who played for Liaoning FC, Shanghai Shenhua, Queensland Roar and China national team
Zhang Yuning (footballer, born 1997), Chinese footballer, who plays for Beijing Sinobo Guoan and China national team